The Spider is a 1945 American crime film noir directed by Robert D. Webb and starring Richard Conte, Faye Marlowe, and Kurt Kreuger.

Premise
A private detective is pursued by both police and a mysterious killer.

Cast
 Richard Conte as Chris Conlon
 Faye Marlowe as Delilah 'Lila' Neilsen, alias Judith Smith
 Kurt Kreuger as Ernest, alias Garonne
 John Harvey as Burns
 Martin Kosleck as Mikail Barak
 Mantan Moreland as Henry
 Walter Sande as Det. Lt. Walter Castle
 Cara Williams as Wanda Vann, neighbor
 Charles Tannen as Det. Tonti
 Margaret Brayton as Jean, police records clerk
 Ann Savage as Florence Cain
 Harry Seymour as Ed, the Bartender
 Jean Del Val as Henri Dutrelle, hotel manager
 Odette Vigne as Mrs. Dutrelle
 Ruth Clifford As Mrs. Gillespie/Tenant
 James Flavin as Officer Johnny Tracy

Production
The film was based on a 1928 play which Fox had filmed in 1931. The project was announced in May 1945, and the original female star was meant to be Carole Landis alongside Conte.

Critical reception
The Los Angeles Times said it "was not without fair interest".

Film critic Dennis Schwartz gave the film a mixed review, writing, "Robert D. Webb directs a lackluster B-film noir from the play by Charles Fulton...The Spider was a poor remake of the 1931 film of the same title. It held very little suspense, and the plot was filled with gaping holes. But Richard Conte is a fine action actor, and gives this slight film noir story a little boost just by his presence."

References

External links
 
 
 
The Spider at Letterbox DVD
The Spider at BFI

1945 films
1945 crime drama films
20th Century Fox films
American black-and-white films
American crime drama films
Film noir
Films directed by Robert D. Webb
Films scored by David Buttolph
Films set in Louisiana
1940s English-language films
1940s American films